Christoph Marthaler (born 17 October 1951, in Erlenbach, Switzerland) is a Swiss director and musician, working in the style of avant-garde theater, such as Expressionism and Dada, a theater of the absurd elements.

In 1998, he was awarded the IV Europe Prize Theatrical Realities.

Performances  

 1980: Zurich Theatre Spectacle, Rote Fabrik: Christoph Marthaler –  Indeed. An interior 
 1983: Zurich: Christoph Marthaler after Erik Satie –  Blanc et immobile 
 1985: Minimal Festival Zurich: Christoph Marthaler after Erik Satie –  Vexations 
 1985: Zurich: Christoph Marthaler –  Big words anthem. An Impromptu for choir, orchestra, six important men and a stowaway. 
 1988: Zurich Playhouse: Kurt Schwitters –  Ribble Bobble Pimlico 
 1988: Theater Basel: Christoph Marthaler / Barbara Mundel –  arrival Badischer Bahnhof 
 1989: Theater Basel: Christoph Marthaler –  When the Alpine Mind Reddens, Kill, Free Swiss, Kill 
 1990: Theater Basel: Christoph Marthaler –  Stägeli uf, Stägeli off juhee! 
 1991: Theater Basel: Eugène Labiche –  The affair Rue de Lourcine 
 1992 Schlotterbeck Garage Basel: –  Amora 
 1992: Theater Basel: Christoph Marthaler after Fernando Pessoa –  Faust. A subjective tragedy 
 1992: Theater Basel: Samuel Beckett –  A piece of monologue / Still no longer 
 1993: Volksbühne Berlin: Christoph Marthaler –  Murx the Europeans! Murx him! Murx him! Murx him! Murx it off!  (Invitation to the Berliner Theatertreffen)
 1993: Theater Basel: Christoph Marthaler –  ProHelvetia 
 1993: Deutsches Schauspielhaus Hamburg: Christoph Marthaler by Johann Wolfgang von Goethe –  Goethe's Faust Root 1 + 2  (Invitation to the Berliner Theatertreffen)
 1994: Oper Frankfurt: Claude Debussy –  Pelléas et Mélisande 
 1994 Volksbühne Berlin: Christoph Marthaler by William Shakespeare –  storm before Shakespeare – le petit Rien 
 1994: Deutsches Schauspielhaus, Hamburg: Christoph Marthaler –  Addiction / pleasure 
 1994 Volksbühne Berlin: Christoph Marthaler by Karl Valentin and Maurice Maeterlinck –  The intruder – an anniversary concert in two acts 
 1995: Deutsches Schauspielhaus Hamburg: Christoph Marthaler / Stefanie Carp –  Zero Hour or the Art of serving  (Invitation to the Berliner Theatertreffen) 
 1995: Deutsches Schauspielhaus Hamburg: Elias Canetti –  wedding 
 1996: Salzburg Festival: Arnold Schoenberg / Messiaen –  Pierrot Lunaire / Quatuor pour la fin du temps 
 1996: Deutsches Schauspielhaus Hamburg: Ödön von Horváth –  Kasimir and Karoline  (Invitation to the Berliner Theatertreffen)
 1996: World in Basel and Volksbühne Berlin: Christoph Marthaler –  Lina Böglis travel  (Invitation to the Berliner Theatertreffen)
 1996: Volksbühne Berlin: Christoph Marthaler –  Street of the Best. A tour 
 1996: Oper Frankfurt: Giuseppe Verdi –  Luisa Miller 
 1996: Opéra La Monnaie, Brussels: Klaas de Vries by Virginia Woolf and Fernando Pessoa –  A King, Riding 
 1996: International Music Festival in Lucerne: Michael Jarrell for Christa Wolf –  Cassandra  director Christoph Marthaler and Anne Bennent
 1997: Theater Basel: Christoph Marthaler / Jürg Henneberger –  The Unanswered Question  (Invitation to the Berliner Theatertreffen) 
 1997: Volksbühne Berlin: Anton Chekhov –  Three Sisters 
 1997: Oper Frankfurt: Ludwig van Beethoven –  Fidelio 
 1998: German Schauspielhaus Hamburg: Joseph Kesselring –  Arsenic and Old Lace '
 1998: Volksbühne Berlin: Jacques Offenbach –  La Vie Parisienne  1998: Salzburg Festival: Leoš Janáček –  Katya Kabanova  1999: Deutsches Schauspielhaus Hamburg: Christoph Marthaler –  Specialists. A survival tea dance  1999: Salzburg Festival: Ödön von Horváth –  Beautiful View  2000: Theater Basel: Christoph Marthaler / Anna Viebrock / Jürg Henneberger –  20th Century Blues  2000: Schauspielhaus Zurich: Christoph Marthaler –  Hotel anxiety  2001: Schauspielhaus Zurich: William Shakespeare –  Twelfth  (Invitation to the Berliner Theatertreffen) 
 2001: Schauspielhaus Zurich: Christoph Marthaler by Franz Schubert –  The Beautiful Miller  (Invitation to the Berliner Theatertreffen)
 2001: Salzburg Festival: Wolfgang Amadeus Mozart –  Le nozze di Figaro  2001: Volksbühne Berlin: Christoph Marthaler after Raffaele Viviani –  The Ten Commandments  2002: Schauspielhaus Zurich: Thomas Hürlimann –  synchro  2002: Münchner Kammerspiele: Elfriede Jelinek –  In the Alps  2003: Schauspielhaus Zurich: Christoph Marthaler –  Groundings  (Invitation to the Berliner Theatertreffen)
 2003: Schauspielhaus Zurich: Georg Büchner –  Danton's Death  (Invitation to the Berliner Theatertreffen)
 2003: Volksbühne Berlin: Christoph Marthaler after Herman Melville –  Better not. A thinning  2003: Schauspielhaus Zurich: Christoph Marthaler after Ovid –  The Golden Age , with Stefan Pucher and Meg Stuart
 2003: Opera Zurich / Zurich Schauspielhaus: Beat Furrer –  Invocation  2004: Schauspielhaus Zurich: Christoph Marthaler –  T.D.C. A replacement Passion  (Invitation to the Berliner Theatertreffen)
 2004: Nederlands Toneel (NT) Gent: Christoph Marthaler after Herman Heijermans –  shanties  2005: Vienna Festival: Christoph Marthaler / Stefanie Carp –  Protection from the Future  (Invitation to the Berliner Theatertreffen, Nestroy Theatre Prize for Best Director)
 2005: Donaueschingen Festival: Beat Furrer –  FAMA. Sound theater for large ensemble, eight voices, actress and sound building  2005: Bayreuth Festival: Richard Wagner –  Tristan und Isolde  2005: Volksbühne Berlin: Christoph Marthaler –  The fruit fly  2006: KunstenFESTIVALdesArts Brussels: Christoph Marthaler –  Winch only  (Premio Ubu, Italy)
 2006: Volksbühne Berlin: Ödön von Horváth –  Tales from the Vienna Woods  2007: Nederlands Theatre (NT) Gent / Toneelgroep Amsterdam: Christoph Marthaler –  Maeterlinck  2007: Opéra national de Paris: Giuseppe Verdi –  La traviata  2007: Salzburg Festival / Ruhr Triennale: Christoph Marthaler –  Sauser from Italy. A Urheberei  2007: Rote Fabrik Zurich: Christoph Marthaler –  lack of space  (Invitation to the Berliner Theatertreffen)
 2008: Opéra national de Paris: Alban Berg –  Wozzeck  2008: Hotel Waldhaus Sils-Maria: Christoph Marthaler –  The theater with the Waldhaus  (Invitation to the Berliner Theatertreffen)
 2008: Centre culturel suisse de Paris: Christoph Marthaler –  Lorem Ipsum Dolor: carte blanche à Christoph Marthaler  2009: Vienna Festival: Christoph Marthaler and Anna Viebrock –  Riesenbutzbach. A permanent colony.  (Invitation to the Berliner Theatertreffen)
 2009: Theater Basel: Jacques Offenbach –  La Grande-Duchesse de Gérolstein  2010: Theater Basel: Beat Furrer –  Wüstenbuch  2010: Festival d'Avignon: Christoph Marthaler and Anna Viebrock –  Nonsense '
 2010: Theater Basel: My fair lady – a language laboratory
 2011: Katuaq Nuuk / Vienna Festival.  + – 0 A subpolar basecamp , musical Greenland project; UA 12 May 2011
 2011: Salzburg Festival: Leoš Janáček –  The Makropulos 
 2011: Theater Basel: Christoph Marthaler, Malte Ubenauf, Bendix Dethleffsen –  Lo stimolatore cardiaco 
 2012: Volksbühne Berlin / Vienna Festival: Ödön von Horváth –  GlaubeLiebeHoffnung 
 2012: Zurich Opera House: Christoph Marthaler, Anna Viebrock, Laurence Cummings, Malte Ubenauf –  Sale 
 2013: Acting Cologne: Sasha Rau –  Oh it's like home 
 2013: Theater Basel: Christoph Marthaler, Malte Ubenauf, Bendix Dethleffsen –  king. An enharmonic 
 2013: Vienna Festival: Christoph Marthaler, Uli Fussenegger –  Last Days. An eve 
 2013: Theater Basel: Christoph Marthaler / Eugene Labuche –  Das Weisse from egg (Une ile flottante) 
 2014: Deutsches Schauspielhaus Hamburg: Christoph Marthaler, Anna Viebrock, Malte Ubenauf –  homesickness & Crime 
 2014: Teatro Real Madrid: Jacques Offenbach –  Les contes d'Hoffmann 
 2014: Volksbühne Berlin: Christoph Marthaler, Anna Viebrock, Malte Ubenauf –  Tessa Blomstedt does not give up  
 2015: Deutsches Schauspielhaus Hamburg: John Osborne –  The Entertainer '
 2015: Theater Basel / Hamburg State Opera: Christoph Marthaler –  Isolde 'supper' '
 2015: Zurich Opera House: G. Rossini –  Il Viaggio A Reims 
 2016: Volksbühne Berlin: Christoph Marthaler –  Hallelujah (A Reserve)

Awards
 1992: Culture Prize of the Canton of Basel-Country
 1994: Director of the Year, Theater today
 1996: main prize of the VI. International Festival of Torun, Poland
 1996: Konrad Wolf Prize of Academy of Arts, Berlin
 1997: Fritz Kortner Prize
 1997: Director of the Year, Theatre today
 1998: Europe Prize Theatrical Realities
 1998: Friedrich Luft Prize for  Parisian life  at the Volksbühne Berlin
 1999: Premio Ubu, Italy
 2004: Theatre Award Berlin, together with the set designer Anna Viebrock
 2004: recognition medal of the City of Zurich for special cultural achievements
 2005: Nestroy Theatre Prize (Best director) for  Protection from the Future 
 2006: Premio Ubu, Italy
 2007: International Stanislavsky Award 2007
 2008: Politika Award of the Festival BITEF, Belgrade
 2009: Cultural Prize of the Canton of Zurich
 2011: Hans Reinhart Ring
 2015: Golden Lion of the Venice Biennale (Biennale Teatro)
 2015: Premio Ubu, Italy
 2018: International Ibsen Award

References

External links
  
 Official website

1951 births
Entertainers from Zürich
Swiss theatre directors
Members of the Academy of Arts, Berlin
Swiss opera directors
20th-century Swiss musicians
Living people
21st-century Swiss musicians